Johannes Wolfgang Zender (22 November 1936 – 22 October 2019) was a German conductor and composer. He was the chief conductor of several opera houses, and his compositions, many of them vocal music, have been performed at international festivals.

As a conductor, he worked at the Theater Freiburg, Theater Bonn, Opernhaus Kiel and Hamburg State Opera, and led the radio orchestra Deutsche Radio Philharmonie Saarbrücken Kaiserslautern. He taught at the Musikhochschule Frankfurt. His opera Stephen Climax premiered in 1986 at the Oper Frankfurt, and his third opera, Chief Joseph, premiered in 2005 at the Staatsoper Unter den Linden.

Career 
Born in Wiesbaden, Zender attended the Maifestspiele at age 13, listening to concerts conducted by Carl Schuricht, Karl Böhm and Günter Wand, among others. He took piano lessons and learned to play the organ. From 1949, he went each year to the Darmstädter Ferienkurse, where he got to know trends in new music by Karlheinz Stockhausen, Olivier Messiaen and John Cage. He studied piano, conducting, and composition (the latter with Wolfgang Fortner) at the Hochschule für Musik Frankfurt and the Hochschule für Musik Freiburg from 1956 to 1959. He was trained as a concert pianist by Edith Picht-Axenfeld.

From 1959 to 1963 Zender was Kapellmeister of the Theater Freiburg, then principal conductor at the Theater Bonn from 1964 to 1968. In 1964–65 he attended the Second Cologne Courses for New Music at the Rheinische Musikhochschule, under the artistic direction of Stockhausen. In 1968 he was called to Kiel, where he was Generalmusikdirektor (GMD) of the Opernhaus Kiel until 1972. From 1971, he also was principal conductor of the Radio Symphony Orchestra in Saarbrücken. In 1984, Zender became head of the Hamburg State Opera and GMD of the orchestra there. From 1987 to 1990, he was chief conductor of the Chamber Orchestra of Radio Netherlands in Hilversum. From 1999 to 2011, he was the permanent guest conductor and a member of the artistic board of the SWR Symphony Orchestra Baden-Baden and Freiburg, now part of the SWR Symphonieorchester.

Zender's opera Stephen Climax, with his own libretto based on James Joyce and Hugo Ball, was premiered on 15 June 1986 at the Oper Frankfurt, staged by Alfred Kirchner and conducted by Peter Hirsch.

From 1988 until 2000, Zender taught composition at the Hochschule für Musik und Darstellende Kunst in Frankfurt. Among his students was Isabel Mundry. Invited by Walter Fink, he was in 2011 the 21st composer featured in the annual Komponistenporträt of the Rheingau Musik Festival. Music in a chamber concert included denn wiederkommen (Hölderlin lesen III) for string quartet and speaking voice (1991) and Mnemosyne (Hölderlin lesen IV) for female voice, string quartet, and tape (2000), performed by Salome Kammer and the Athena Quartet.

Zender died on 22 October 2019 in Meersburg, Germany.

Compositions 
Many of Zender's works were published by Breitkopf & Härtel. The published works are held by the German National Library, including:
 Canto I–VI for various forces
 I: for choir, flute, piano, strings and percussion (1965)
 II: for soprano, choir and orchestra on a text by Ezra Pound (1967)
 III: for soprano, tenor, baritone, ten instruments and live-electronics on texts by Cervantes (1968)
 IV: for 16 voices and 16 instruments (1969/72)
 V: for voices with optional percussion (1972/74)
 VI: for bass-baritone, a capella mixed choir, and optional tape (1988)
 3 Rondels nach Mallarmé (3 Rondels after Mallarmé) for alto, flute and viola (1966); words by Stéphane Mallarmé
 Modelle for variable forces (1971–73)
 Zeitströme for orchestra (1974)
 Elemente, tape montage for two loudspeaker groups (1976)
 Hölderlin lesen I for string quartet with sprechstimme (1979); words by Friedrich Hölderlin
 Hölderlin lesen II for sprechstimme, viola, and live-electronics (1987); words by Friedrich Hölderlin
 "denn wiederkommen" (Hölderlin lesen III) for string quartet and sprechstimme (1991)
 Mnemosyne (Hölderlin lesen IV) for female voice, string quartet, and tape (2000)
 Fünf Haiku (LO-SHU IV) for flute and strings (1982)
 Dialog mit Haydn for two pianos and three orchestral groups (1982)
 Stephen Climax, opera (1979–84, premiered in 1986)
 Don Quijote de la Mancha, opera (1989–91, premiered in 1993; new version 1994, premiered in 1999)
 Schuberts "Winterreise" — Eine komponierte Interpretation for tenor and small orchestra (1993)
 Shir Hashirim—Lied der Lieder (Canto VIII), oratorio for soli, choir, orchestra, and live-electronics (1992/96, complete première in 1998)
 Schumann-Fantasie for large orchestra (1997)
 Chief Joseph, on the life of Chief Joseph, musical theatre in three acts (premiered in 2005)

Writings 
 Zender, Hans. 2004. Die Sinne denken. Texte zur Musik 1975-2003. Edited by Jörn Peter Hiekel. Wiesbaden: Breitkopf & Härtel.  (a nearly complete edition of Zender's writings)
 ———.1999. "A Road Map for Orpheus?" In Theory into Practice: Composition, Performance, and the Listening Experience. Collected writings of the Orpheus Institute 2. Edited by Peter Dejans. Leuven: Katholieke Universiteit Leuven. 
 ———. 1991. Happy New Ears. Das Abenteuer, Musik zu hören. Freiburg im Breisgau: Herder. 
 ———. 1998. Wir steigen niemals in denselben Fluß. Wie Musikhören sich wandelt. Second edition. Freiburg im Breisgau: Herder.

Awards 
Zender's awards include:
 1963/64: Villa Massimo scholarship
 1968/69: Villa Massimo second scholarship
 1980: 
 1997: Frankfurter Musikpreis
 1997: Goethe Prize of Frankfurt
 2002: Hessian Cultural Prize
 2011: Preis der Europäischen Kirchenmusik

Further reading 
 Gruhn, Wilfried. 1994. "Auf der Suche nach der verlorenen Wärme? Zu Hans Zenders komponierter Interpretation von Schuberts Winterreise." Musica 48:148–154.
 ———. 1992. "Hans Zender." In Komponisten der Gegenwart, Loseblattlexikon, edited by Hanns-Werner Heister und Walter-Wolfgang Sparrer, 12. Munich: Text+Kritik. Updated edition July 1997.
 ———. 1985. "Musik über Musik. Vermittlungsaspekte des Streichquartetts Hölderlin lesen von Hans Zender." Musik und Bildung 17:598–605
 Hasegawa, Robert. 2011. "Gegenstrebende Harmonik in the Music of Hans Zender". Perspectives of New Music 49, no. 1 (Winter): 207–234.
 Wacker, Volker. 1998. "Hans Zenders Oper Stephen Climax. Betrachtungen und Aspekte." In Musiktheater im 20. Jahrhundert = Hamburger Jahrbuch für Musikwissenschaft 10, edited by Constantin Floros, Hans Joachim Marx, and Peter Petersen, 239–258. Laaber: Laaber.

References

External links 
 
 Hans Zender Boosey & Hawkes

 
 
 
 Hans Zender: Work List Schirmer
 Hans Zender ks-schoerke.de
 Michaela Friedrich: Hans Zender im Interview / "Musik und Sprache sind nicht zu trennen" BR 7 October 2016
 Berhard Neuhoff: Hans Zender zum 80. Geburtstag / Magische Momente vor dem Hintergrund der Stille BR 21 November 2016

1936 births
2019 deaths
20th-century classical composers
21st-century classical composers
German male conductors (music)
People from Wiesbaden
Frankfurt University of Music and Performing Arts alumni
Academic staff of the Frankfurt University of Music and Performing Arts
German opera composers
Male opera composers
People from Hesse-Nassau
Hochschule für Musik Freiburg alumni
Pupils of Karlheinz Stockhausen
German male classical composers
20th-century German composers
21st-century German composers
20th-century German conductors (music)
21st-century German conductors (music)
20th-century German male musicians
21st-century German male musicians